Tàizhōu is a prefecture-level city in central Jiangsu province in eastern China. Situated on the north bank of the Yangtze River, it borders Nantong to the east, Yancheng to the north and Yangzhou to the west.

The 2020 Chinese census counted its population at 4,512,762 of whom 1,728,408 live in the built-up (or metro) area made of three urban districts (Hailing, Jiangyan and Gaogang). Two county-level cities have more than 1 million inhabitants, Xinghua with 1,253,548 inhabitants and Taixing with 1,073,921 inhabitants, comprising two of the most important county-level cities in China. Hu Jintao, former General Secretary of the Chinese Communist Party, considers Taizhou his home town as did Mei Lanfang, one of the most famous Peking opera artists in modern Chinese history.

Administration and population

The prefecture-level city of Taizhou administers six county-level divisions, including two districts and four county-level cities.

These are further divided into 105 township-level divisions, including 91 towns, eight townships and six subdistricts.

At the end of 2019, the total household registration population was 5,005,500, and the birth population was 35,300 (birth rate 7.02 ‰), a decrease of 1.37 thousand points from the previous year. 43,400 people died in 2019 (mortality rate 8.64 ‰), an increase of 0.2 thousand points from the previous year. At the end of each year, the city's permanent population was 4,636,100, an increase of 400 over the previous year. At the end of 2019, the urbanization population of permanent residents reached 66.8%, an increase of 0.8 percentage points over the previous year.

Geography and climate

Taizhou lies at the confluence of the Yangtze River and the Jinghang Canal (Grand Canal of China), in the south-central Jiangsu Province, which is on the north bank of lower reaches of the Yangtze River, the south end of Jianghuai Plain.

Neighbouring areas: Yangzhou to the west, Nantong to the east, and Yancheng to the north.

As with the rest of central and southern Jiangsu, Taizhou has a humid subtropical climate (Köppen Cfa), influenced by the East Asian Monsoon, with cold, damp, but comparatively dry, winters, and hot, humid summers with copious rain.

History

Taizhou was known as Haiyang in the Spring and Autumn period, supposedly.

As a part of Linhuai Commandery, Hailing county was founded in what is modern-day Taizhou, during the Western Han. Its designation indicates it was a coastal elevated area. Hailing and its neighbourhood were taken away from Yangzhou to create a prefecture, Tai zhou, in 937 when Li Bian of the Southern Tang reigned over the area. In 939, Li kept the bereaved Yang family under house arrest at Yongning Palace, Taizhou, after Yang Pu's death.

Taizhou was elevated to lu (circuit) status in 1277, but restored and annexed by Yangzhou again, seven years later.

In the very beginning of Republican China, Tai zhou was turned into Tai county, taken by the CCP on 21 January 1949. Then the downtown of the county was separated to found Taizhou city, which was the seat of the Administrative Commission for Northern Jiangsu until November. The PLA Navy was established in Baimamiao, Tai county on 23 April 1949. The county and the city were merged into the new Tai county in May 1950, but restored in October. It was reconverted in 1958, but divided again in 1962.

Economy

Taizhou is a center for flour mills, textile works, fishing net manufacturing, and other industries based on local agriculture.

In the past 20 years, the economic growth has remained stable with an average annual growth rate exceeding 10%. It is one of the central cities inside the Yangtse River Delta with its developed industry, convenient transportation and prosperous commerce. In 2019, the GDP reached RMB 474.45 billion yuan, the GDP per capita RMB 110,731 yuan, equals to 16,024 dollars, the fiscal revenue RMB 37.5 billion yuan, the total amount of bank deposits RMB 688 billion yuan. Five county-level cities or districts are ranked among the "China's Top 100 Counties with Greatest Comprehensive Power". It boasts numbers of large-sized enterprises or groups, such as Chunlan Group Corp.

Taizhou was among the first few cities in Jiangsu to be recognized as having a famous cultural history. In 1990, Heheng village in Jiangyan County was awarded Global 500 Roll of Honor by the United Nations Environment Programme (UNEP) because of its success in protecting the environment while increasing the grain yield and its wide use of marsh biogas ponds.

Taizhou's China Medical City (CMC) is a specialized development zone located south of downtown Hailing district; it has attracted major international and domestic corporations who have established facilities here since its establishment in 2010. To date, more than 800 pharmaceutical enterprises have located businesses and incubation centers in CMC.  Pharma companies include AstraZeneca, Takeda Pharmaceutical, Boehringer-Ingelheim, CSPC Pharmaceutical Group and Neptunus Pharmaceutical, as well as Yangtze River Pharmaceutical Company.

International relations

Twin towns – Sister cities
Taizhou is twinned with:

Transportation
The G2 Beijing–Shanghai Expressway and Jiangsu Provincial Highway 29 (S29 Yancheng-Jingjiang Expressway) pass through the city from north to south, and Jiangsu Provincial Highway 28 (S28 Qidong-Yangzhou Expressway) from west to east.

Taizhou Municipality has two Yangtze River crossings, the Taizhou Yangtze River Bridge from Gaogang District to Yangzhong and the Jiangyin Yangtze River Bridge from Jingjiang to Jiangyin.

The routes to get to Taizhou includes:
 Take buses from Shanghai or Nanjing through the G2 Beijing–Shanghai Expressway, which passes south of the city center.
 Take trains from Beijing through Xinyi–Changxing railway or Nanjing through Nanjing–Qidong railway.

Military
Taizhou is the headquarters of the East Sea Fleet of the People's Liberation Army Navy.

Companies headquartered in Taizhou
 Chunlan Group Corp
 Linghai Motocyle Corp
 Yangtze River Pharmaceutical Group
 Oberon Dishwashing Equipment Manufacturing Co. Ltd

Tourism

 Gardens and Parks
Qintong Boat Festival, Jiangyan
Qintong Boat Festival is held in Qingming (around April 4–6) every year.  During the festival boats from nearby villages and towns converge on Xique Lake for a few days of rejoicing.  Theatrical performances, dragon and lion dances, and other folk dances are staged right on board the boats.
 Xique Lake, Jiangyan
The water comes from the Nanhu, Xique, and Beihu rivers. It is part of Qintong Swamp.
 Père David's Deer Reserve, Jiangyan
Biggest reserve outside of Dafeng.
 Taizhou Park
 Heheng Agricultural Tour, Shengao, Jiangyan
 Museum
 Navy Birthplace Museum
 Hu Jintao Birthplace Museum, Jiangyan
 Gao Ershi Museum, Jiangyan
 Mei Lanfang Garden, opposite of 'Old Street;'

Colleges and schools

 Taizhou High School
 Jingjiang High School
 Taizhou No. 2 High School
 Jiangyan High School
 
 Xinghua High School

References

External links

 Government website of Taizhou (available in Chinese and English)
 Official Travel and Tourism Website for Taizhou (available in English)
 Taizhou comprehensive guide with open directory (Jiangsu.NET)
 Qintong Boat Festival

 
Cities in Jiangsu
Populated places on the Yangtze River